Electric Loco Shed, Kanpur is a motive power depot performing locomotive maintenance and repair facility for electric locomotives of the Indian Railways, located at Kanpur of the North Central Railway zone in Uttar Pradesh, India.

Operation
Being one of the electric engine sheds in North Central Railway, various major and minor maintenance schedules of electric locomotives are carried out here. It has the sanctioned capacity of 150 engine units. Beyond the operating capacity, this shed houses a total of 243 engine units, including 15 WAP-4, 50+ WAP-7, 70+ WAG-7 and 90+ WAG-9. Like all locomotive sheds, CNB does regular maintenance, overhaul and repair including painting and washing of locomotives. CNB locomotives used to be predominantly the regular links for trains traveling to north and east as well.

Locomotive

References

Economy of Kanpur
Rail infrastructure in Uttar Pradesh
Kanpur
Transport in Kanpur
1965 establishments in Uttar Pradesh